The North Chōsen Colonial Railway (Japanese: 北鮮拓殖鐵道株式會社, Hokusen Takushoku Tetsudō Kabushiki Kaisha; Korean: 북선척식철도주식회사, Bukseon Cheoksik Cheoldo Jusikhoesa), was a privately owned railway company in Japanese-occupied Korea.

History
In order to exploit the rich iron deposits of the Musan region, the Chōsen Railway established the North Chōsen Colonial Railway as a subsidiary company and began construction of a new line, calling it the Hambuk Line (not to be confused with the current Hambuk Line, which at that time was part of the Chosen Government Railway's (Sentetsu) Hamgyeong Line). The line was opened in two parts - the Gomusan-Hambuk Sincham section opening on 20 August 1927, and the Sinch'am-Musan segment being opened on 15 November 1929. On 1 February 1937, Musan Cheolsan Station was opened.

Originally built as a narrow-gauge line, the conversion to standard gauge was completed on 1 May 1940, and the extension to Musan Gangan station was completed then as well. On 1 April 1944, the line was absorbed into Sentetsu; at the same time, the line was given its current name, Musan Line, and the extension to Musan Gangan station was closed.

After the partition of Korea the line was within the territory of the DPRK, and was nationalised by the Provisional People’s Committee for North Korea along with all other railways in the Soviet zone of occupation on 10 August 1946; the line retained the name given it by Sentetsu, Musan Line.

Services
In the last timetable issued prior to the start of the Pacific War in November 1942, the North Chōsen Colonial Railway was operating four daily round trip passenger trains between Gomusan and Musan, timed to connect with local and express services on Sentetsu's Hamgyeong Line.

Motive Power

Prior to the conversion of the line to standard gauge, locomotives on the line included Class 810 locomotives of the Chōsen Railway. After it was converted to standard gauge, the primary power on the line was twenty-two heavy 2-8-2 steam locomotives identical to the South Manchuria Railway's Mikai class engines. Built by Kisha Seizō of Japan, they were numbered 1 through 22.

After the North Chosen Colonial Railway was nationalised, these locomotives were taken over by Sentetsu, but their subsequent numbering is unknown.

Route

References

Rail transport in North Korea
Rail transport in Korea
Defunct railway companies of Korea
Korea under Japanese rule
Defunct companies of Japan